Alan Baxter may refer to:

 Alan Baxter (actor) (1908–1976), American film actor
 Alan Baxter (author) (born 1970), British-Australian author
 Alan Baxter (politician) (1912–1976), New Zealand politician

See also
Alain Baxter (born 1973), British skier
Allan Baxter (disambiguation)